The following lists events that happened during 2016 in Cuba.

Incumbents
 First Secretary of the Communist Party of Cuba: Raúl Castro
 Second Secretary: José Ramón Machado Ventura
 President of the Council of State: Raúl Castro
 First Vice President: Miguel Díaz-Canel

Events
August 5–21 - 62 athletes from Cuba competed at the 2016 Summer Olympics in Rio de Janeiro, Brazil.

Deaths
  November 25 – Fidel Castro, Former President of Cuba (b. 1926).

References

See also
Cuba at the 2016 Summer Olympics

 
2010s in Cuba
Years of the 21st century in Cuba